The russet-backed oropendola (Psarocolius angustifrons) is a species of bird in the family Icteridae. It is found in wooded habitats in the highlands of the northern and central Andes and the Venezuelan Coastal Range, and in lowlands of the western Amazon. It is generally common and widespread. Males are larger than females, but otherwise the genders are similar. Its plumage is mainly olive and brown, and the outer rectrices are contrastingly yellow. The lowland nominate subspecies has a black bill, while the highland subspecies all have pale bills. These have been regarded as separate species, but as they hybridize freely, all major authorities now regard them as a single species.

References

russet-backed oropendola
Birds of Colombia
Birds of the Venezuelan Andes
Birds of Ecuador
Birds of the Peruvian Amazon
Birds of Bolivia
Birds of the Amazon Basin
russet-backed oropendola
Taxonomy articles created by Polbot